Royal Botanic Gardens Victoria are botanic gardens across two sites–Melbourne and Cranbourne.

Melbourne Gardens was founded in 1846 when land was reserved on the south side of the Yarra River for a new botanic garden. It extends across  that slope to the river with trees, garden beds, lakes and lawns. It displays almost 50,000 individual plants representing 8,500 different species. These are displayed in 30 living plant collections.

Cranbourne Gardens was established in 1970 when land was acquired by the Gardens on Melbourne's south-eastern urban fringe for the purpose of establishing a garden dedicated to Australian plants. A generally wild site that is significant for biodiversity conservation, it opened to the public in 1989. On the  site, visitors can explore native bushland, heathlands, wetlands and woodlands. One of the features of Cranbourne is the Australian Garden, which celebrates Australian landscapes and flora through the display of approximately 170,000 plants from 1,700 plant varieties. It was completed in 2012.

Royal Botanic Gardens Victoria is home to the State Botanical Collection, which is housed in the National Herbarium of Victoria. The collection, which includes 1.5 million preserved plants, algae and fungi, represents the largest herbarium collection in Australia and wider Oceania. It also includes Australia's most comprehensive botanical library.

Governance and history
The gardens are governed under the Royal Botanic Gardens Act 1991 by the Royal Botanic Gardens Board, who are responsible to the Minister for Environment.

In 1846 Charles La Trobe selected the site for the Royal Botanic Gardens from marshland and swamp.

In 1857 the first director was Ferdinand von Mueller, who created the National Herbarium of Victoria and brought in many plants.

In 1873 William Guilfoyle became Director and changed the style of the Gardens to something more like the picturesque gardens that were around at that time. He added tropical and temperate plants.

In 1877 Sir Edmund Barton, Australia's first Prime Minister and Jane Ross were married at the Royal Botanic Gardens.

In 1924 a shooting massacre occurred at the Gardens resulting in the death of four people.

In June 2015 the Gardens brought together the elements of the organisation under the name Royal Botanic Gardens Victoria, incorporating Melbourne Gardens, Cranbourne Gardens, the National Herbarium of Victoria and the Australian Research Centre for Urban Ecology (ARCUE)

Horticulture

Living collections at the Botanic Gardens include the Australian Forest Walk, California Garden, Cacti and Succulents, Camellia Collection, Cycad Collection, Eucalypts, Fern Gully, Grey Garden, Herb Garden, Long Island, New Caledonia Collection, New Zealand Collection, Oak Lawn, Perennial Border, Roses, Southern Africa Collection, Southern China Collection, Tropical Display-Glasshouse, Viburnum Collection and Water Conservation Garden.

Ecology
The gardens include a mixture of native and non-native vegetation which invariably hosts a diverse range of both native and non-native fauna. The gardens host over 10,000 floral species, the majority being non-native species. The gardens were the origin from which many introduced species spread throughout south-eastern Australia as seeds were traded between early European botanists in the mid-19th century, studying the Australian flora.

Native vegetation
From the establishment of the gardens in 1846, much of the native vegetation was removed as botanists such as Baron Von Mueller planted a range of species from around the world. While initially much of the native wetlands and swamplands in the gardens were left, around the turn of the 20th century these were re-landscaped to create the Ornamental Lake. Despite this, however, there are some large eucalypts remaining including the prominent Separation Tree, a 300-year-old River Red Gum, under which Victoria was declared a separate colony. In August 2010 the Separation Tree was attacked by vandals and then attacked again in 2013, by 2015 it was dead and removal of the canopy and branches commenced. The Royal Botanic Gardens, Cranbourne focus solely on Australian native plants.

Non-native traditional gardens
The Royal Botanic Gardens Melbourne were initially intended to be a horticultural exhibition for the public to enjoy, many seeds were traded between early European botanists such as Arthur and Von Mueller, who planted non-native species. The Queen and her grandfather, Dame Nellie Melba and Paderewski contributed plantings on occasions throughout the history of the gardens.

Plant science
Since its earliest days, the Royal Botanic Gardens is involved in plant research and identification. This is done primarily through the National Herbarium of Victoria, which is based at the Gardens. The Herbarium is also home to the State Botanical Collection, which includes over 1.5 million dried plant specimens, and an extensive collection of books, journals and artworks. Research findings are published in the journal Muelleria, which is a scientific representation of the work done in the Gardens in any one year. More recently, the Australian Research Centre for Urban Ecology has been established to look at plants that grow in urban environments specifically.

The Ian Potter Foundation Children's Garden

The 5,000 square metres Ian Potter Foundation Children's Garden is designed as a discovery area for children of all ages and abilities. The Ian Potter Children's Garden is based in South Yarra, off the main site. This area is closed for two months of the year from the end of the Victorian July school holidays for rest and maintenance.

Gallery

References

External links

RBG website

Botanical gardens in Victoria (Australia)
Parks in Melbourne
Tourist attractions in Melbourne
2006 Commonwealth Games venues
1846 establishments in Australia
Environment of Victoria (Australia)
Landmarks in Melbourne
Royal Botanic Gardens Victoria
Buildings and structures in the City of Melbourne (LGA)